Greatest Hits  is a 1980 album by Rita Coolidge and was released on the A&M Records label.  This was her first compilation album and contains all previously released material.  The only song that did not appear on a previous Rita Coolidge album is "Fool That I Am", which was from the movie soundtrack album Coast to Coast.

Track listing

Side one
"Born Under a Bad Sign" (Booker T. Jones, William Bell) – 4:10
"We're All Alone" (Boz Scaggs) – 3:38
"Fool That I Am" (Bruce Roberts, Carole Bayer Sager) – 3:07
"Your Love Has Lifted Me (Higher and Higher)" (Paul Smith, Gary Jackson, Raynard Miner, Billy Davis) – 3:55
"Nice Feelin'" (Marc Benno) – 5:26
"The Way You Do The Things You Do" (William "Smokey" Robinson, Robert Rogers) – 3:35

Side two
"I'd Rather Leave While I'm in Love" (Carole Bayer Sager, Peter Allen) – 3:28
"Words" (Barry Gibb, Robin Gibb, Maurice Gibb) – 3:25
"Only You Know and I Know" (Dave Mason) – 3:36
"I Don't Want to Talk About It" (Danny Whitten) – 3:36
"Fever" (Johnny Davenport, Eddie Cooley) – 3:28
"Am I Blue" (Grant Clarke, Harry Akst) – 4:37

Charts

References

Rita Coolidge albums
1980 greatest hits albums
A&M Records compilation albums